The Tippecanoe Battlefield Park preserves the location of the Battle of Tippecanoe fought on November 7, 1811.

The  site of the battle was deeded to the State of Indiana by John Tipton, a veteran of the fight, on November 7, 1836, the twenty-fifth anniversary of the battle. The site was used for a number of major political rallies during its earlier years, those most significant being on May 29, 1840 in favor of William Henry Harrison's bid for the White House attended by 30,000 people.

The location was attracting visitors by the 1850s, and the battlefield was bordered by the Louisville, New Albany, & Salem Railroad during that decade. A refreshment stand was built adjacent to the site to accommodate visitors, and this land was later purchased by the Northwest Indiana Conference of the Methodist Church and used for the Battle Ground Collegiate Institute and later for a Methodist youth camp. Despite interest in the location for the sesquicentennial of the battle in 1961, the camp was abandoned in 1971 and the location was neglected. It was designated a National Historical Landmark in 1960.  It is located in the Battle Ground Historic District.

Local residents acquired the Methodist property upon its closure, and created a museum in the camp's lodge. The citizen's group merged with the Tippecanoe County Historical Association in 1990 which took over operation of the museum. The museum was extensively renovated in 1995.

The Battlefield Monument was ceded to the Tippecanoe County Park Board in 1972.

Recreational opportunities

Hiking (including access to the Wabash Heritage Trail).
Nature Center
Battlefield Monument
Museum

Tippecanoe Battlefield Park is operated by the Tippecanoe County Park Board and the Battlefield Museum is operated by the Tippecanoe County Historical Society.

See also
Battle Ground, Indiana
John Purdue
Battle of Tippecanoe Outdoor Drama

References

External links

Tippecanoe Historical Society webpage for the park
Tippecanoe County Parks Department webpage for the park
"Life Portrait of William Henry Harrison", from C-SPAN's American Presidents: Life Portraits, broadcast from Tippecanoe Battlefield, May 10, 1999

Protected areas of Tippecanoe County, Indiana
Tippecanoe, battle of
National Historic Landmarks in Indiana
Conflict sites on the National Register of Historic Places in Indiana
Parks in Indiana
Museums in Tippecanoe County, Indiana
Monuments and memorials in Indiana
Military and war museums in Indiana
History museums in Indiana
National Register of Historic Places in Tippecanoe County, Indiana